Hyperaspis vinciguerrae, the pitchfork lady beetle, is a species of lady beetle in the family Coccinellidae. It is found in Northern Africa and Western Asia

References 

Coccinellidae
Beetles described in 1929